John McBryde may refer to:

 John McLaren McBryde (1841–1923), president of Virginia Tech, 1891–1907
 John McBryde (field hockey) (born 1939), Australian former field hockey player
 John H. McBryde (born 1931), United States federal judge

See also
 John McBride (disambiguation)